Paris uprising may refer to:

 1832 Paris uprising
 1870 Paris uprising
 January 1871 Paris uprising
 Paris Commune
 1944 Paris uprising